former district located in Niigata Prefecture, Japan that was dissolved in 2005.

As of 2003, the district had an estimated population of 23,292 and a density of 67.40 persons per km2. The total area was 345.56 km2.

History

The district was founded in 1878, when the former Kubiki District was split into Higashikubiki District, Nakakubiki District, and Nishikubiki District. At the time of founding, the district covered the city of Itoigawa and the Nadachi section of the city of Jōetsu. The district seat was located at the town of Itoigawa (now the city of Itoigawa).

 On April 1, 1954 - The former town of Itoigawa absorbed the villages of Uramoto, Shimohayakawa, Kamihayakawa, Yamatogawa, Saikai, Ōno (Daino), Nechi and Kotati (Otaki) to create the city of Itoigawa.

Recent mergers
 On January 1, 2005 - The town of Nadachi, along with the town of Yasuzuka, the villages of Maki, Ōshima and Uragawara (all from Higashikubiki District), the towns of Itakura, Kakizaki, Ōgata and Yoshikawa, and the villages of Kiyosato, Kubiki, Nakagō and Sanwa (all from Nakakubiki District), was merged into the expanded city of Jōetsu.
 On March 19, 2005 - The towns of Nō and Ōmi were merged into the expanded city of Itoigawa. Nishikubiki District was dissolved as a result of this merger.

References 

Former districts of Niigata Prefecture